281 is the 60th prime, twin prime with 283, Sophie Germain prime, sum of the first fourteen primes, sum of seven consecutive primes (29 + 31 + 37 + 41 + 43 + 47 + 53), Chen prime, Eisenstein prime with no imaginary part, centered decagonal number.

281 is the smallest prime p such that the decimal period length of the reciprocal of p is (p−1)/10, i.e. the period length of 1/281 is 28. However, in binary, it has period length 70.

The generalized repunit number  is composite for all prime p < 60000.

Integers